René Menzies (c. November 1889 – c. 1971) was a French long-distance cyclist who at 48 held a record for the greatest distance ridden on a bicycle in a year. He rode  in 1937. He was decorated with the Croix de Guerre in the First World War  and was chauffeur to the French leader, Charles de Gaulle in the second world war.

Background
René Menzies was born in Caen, France, of French and Scottish descent. He moved to England in the early 1930s. His talent for long distances was well known, and it eventually led him to try for the record for the greatest distance in a year.

World endurance record for distance cycled in a single year
In 1911, the weekly magazine Cycling began a competition for the highest number of  rides or "centuries" in a single year. The winner was Marcel Planes with 332 centuries in which he covered . The inspiration for the competition was said to be the efforts of Harry Long, a commercial traveller who rode a bicycle on his rounds covering every part of England and Scotland and who covered  in 1910. The record has been officially established nine times. A tenth claim, by the English rider Ken Webb, was later disallowed.

In that era bicycle companies competed to show their machines were the most reliable. Menzies was sponsored by a British manufacturer, Rudge-Whitworth.

The year record was held by an Australian professional, Ossie Nicholson. It was established in 1933 and broken in 1936 by a one-armed English amateur, Walter Greaves. Nicholson said he would set it again. He had competition, however, from Bernard Bennett, another British rider, and from Menzies. All three men were trying for the record at the same time.

Nicholson started more than 10 kg overweight but rode 300 km a day. He had ridden 40,000 km by the end of May but Menzies had started to close the gap. Menzies, in the European winter, had fallen on icy roads, broken a bone and missed 24 days. The writer Jock Wadley recalled:

That first day of January 1937, soaked to the skin, he came running excitedly to the office about teatime with the news: 'One hundred and feefty miles.' It was the first day of a year's ride; 364 days later he had ridden  and had shown the real meaning of the French word courage by riding for weeks with a broken wrist in plaster and sling.

Winter arrived in Australia as summer came to Europe. Nicholson often rode in the dark to keep up his distance but Menzies had daylight and the two men were level by the start of October. They both beat Greaves' record on the same day.

Menzies reached Greaves' record at Alexandra Palace in London, with Greaves beside him.

Cycling reported:

A year's race had commenced between two widely separated contestants, Ossie Nicholson from Down Under who had already tasted success, and a newcomer, René Menzies, a 48-year-old Frenchman of Scottish descent. René rode in the UK and on the Continent, searching for the hotter weather... Many miles away, Nicholson had found better weather and financial support; at the end of his year he had collected an amazing  this time tasting more than glory as he had also pedalled his way clear of beating the  record, this time in 532 days.

Each of the three riders beat Greaves' mark with Bennett riding  and Menzies riding . Nicholson regained the record with 

Dorothy Curtis, writing in the magazine of the National Cycle Collection in Britain, said Menzies lived in London and sometimes rode  from there to Brighton and back in the morning and then to a café that her mother owned near the Bidlake memorial at Girtford Bridge near Sandy, Bedfordshire, north of London, in the afternoon before returning to London. She said:

He asked my mother if he could put a hut up in the garden with a single bed and a chair so that is he did a night ride he could pop in there and not disturb anybody. Of course we had to sign papers that he had done the miles and also feed him. Sometimes he used to be a bit downhearted so we girls used to buck him up or cheer him on. We used to say 'Now come on, you know all after this looking after you we're expecting a nice prize at the end. I shan't get that free Rudge-Whitworth bike if you don't keep on with your ride.'

At the end of the year, Nicholson is reported to have said "Will you cable Rene Menzies, and tell him I want to be numbered among his greatest admirers. That tough little Frenchman made me ride every mile, and nobody can appreciate his pluck and pedalling ability, and his capacity to take punishment better than I can."

Veteran ride

War stopped Menzies from trying to beat Nicholson. Menzies decided in 1952 to beat Nicholson's distance regardless, to set an unofficial veterans' record, and to ride  to mark his 63rd birthday. Jock Wadley wrote:

We have known René Menzies a long time now... It was therefore not much of a surprise at 1.30pm on December 31, 1951, just as we had closed for press, to get a 'phone call from René saying he was starting his record at midnight. 'Yes, René,' we said. "Which record?"

'Why, of course, the year's mileage record, of course!...' Only four watched that story translated into reality as we saw him off at about twenty past midnight on January 1, 1952. He started without much trade support, but with supreme confidence in his ability to command it as he went along. 'I post my first card from the post office at Marble Arch,' he called out... Since then these cards have showered on our office – there must have been well over 1,000 of them. Each one was signed at the start of a day's ride, at the 'turn', and again at the finish by anybody who happened to be around (postmen, policemen and pull-up-for-carmen-café workers were the chief witnesses), the mileage at each point being logged according to the speedometer reading.

He left from Big Ben in central London as it chimed in 1 January. He wore three woollen sweaters, a beret and plus-fours. He started with a circuit of Parliament Square and rode to Oxford Circus, then Marble Arch to end his first day at Wolverhampton after 121 miles. At one stage he considered returning to France to ride the same roads as the Tour de France. He was dissuaded by the race official, Jacques Goddet, who sent a telegram: "Menzies – don't be a fool. Stay where you have roads like a velodrome. Don't you know when you're well off?" Menzies completed the year with 62,785 miles, beating Nicholson's figure at 10.16 am on the last day. Among those who celebrated with him was another Frenchman, Marcel Planes, who set the first distance record, 34,366 miles, in 1911.

Death
Menzies died at 82 whilst pedalling around Hyde Park Corner, one of the busiest junctions in London.

See also
 Tommy Godwin – Endurance cyclist
 Ken Webb – Endurance cyclist

Notes

References

1889 births
1971 deaths
French male cyclists
Scottish male cyclists
French people of Scottish descent
Sportspeople from Caen
Ultra-distance cyclists
Cyclists from Normandy